Phu Kradueng is a district (amphoe) of Loei province, northeastern Thailand.

Geography
Neighboring districts are (from the north clockwise): Phu Luang, Nong Hin, and Pha Khao of Loei Province; Si Bun Rueang of Nong Bua Lamphu province; Si Chomphu, Chum Phae, and Phu Pha Man of Khon Kaen province; and Nam Nao of Phetchabun province.

Phu Kradueng mountain is in the district.

History
The minor district (king amphoe) was created on 1 January 1962, when the three tambons, Si Than, Puan Phu, and Pha Khao, were split off from Wang Saphung district. It was upgraded to a full district on 16 July 1963.

Administration
The district is divided into four sub-districts (tambons), which are further subdivided into 54 villages (mubans). Phu Kradueng is a township (thesaban tambon) which covers parts of tambons Si Than, Pha Nok Khao, and Phu Kradueng. There are a further four tambon administrative organizations (TAO).

Missing numbers are tambons which now form the Districts Pha Khao and Nong Hin.

References

External links
amphoe.com

Phu Kradueng